Rahja is a surname. Notable people with the surname include:

 Eino Rahja (1885–1936), Finnish-Russian politician
 Jukka Rahja (1887–1920), Russian-Finnish bolshevik
 Rakhya, urban-type settlement in Russia named after Jukka

Surnames of Finnish origin